"Bossman" is a song by Beenie Man released in 2003 as the second single from his sixteenth studio album Tropical Storm. The song was written by Sean Paul, Beenie Man and The Neptunes (who also produces the track), and features fellow dancehall artists Sean Paul and Lady Saw. It failed to chart on any of the Billboard charts, but it did manage to peak at #78 on the UK Singles Chart.

Music video

The official music video for the song was directed by Jeremy Rall.

Track listings
 12" Vinyl
 "Bossman" (album version) – 4:05
 "Bossman" (instrumental) – 3:59

 CD single - US
 "Bossman" (video edit clean) - 3:00
 "Bossman" (instrumental) - 3:59
 "Bad Girl" - 3:53

 CD single - Europe
 "Bossman" (video edit clean) – 3:00
 "Bossman" (album version) – 4:05
 "Bossman" (instrumental) – 3:59

Charts

References

2002 songs
2003 singles
Beenie Man songs
Music videos directed by Jeremy Rall
Sean Paul songs
Lady Saw songs
Song recordings produced by the Neptunes
Songs written by Chad Hugo
Songs written by Sean Paul
Songs written by Pharrell Williams
Virgin Records singles